Selman City is an unincorporated community in western Rusk County, Texas, United States. According to the Handbook of Texas, the community had a population of 271 in 2000. It is located within the Longview, Texas metropolitan area.

History
S.A. Selman discovered oil on his property in the 1930s, making Selman City an oilfield-dominant community. Raymond A. Crawford served as the first postmaster in 1939. The post office also served Turnertown and Joinerville. Its peak population was 450 in 1947-48 with 7 businesses, then declined to 271 from 1980 through 2000 with two new businesses.

Although Selman City is unincorporated, it has a post office, with the ZIP code of 75689.

Geography

Education
Today, the community is served by the West Rusk County Consolidated Independent School District.

References

Unincorporated communities in Rusk County, Texas
Unincorporated communities in Texas